Prof Ferdinand Zirkel FRS(For) HFRSE (20 May 183811 June 1912) was a German geologist and petrographer.

Biography

Zirkel was born in Bonn. Educated in his native town, he graduated PhD from the University of Bonn in 1861. His training and initial interest was in mining.  In 1860 he traveled to Iceland with William Thierry Preyer, and in 1862 they published Reise nach Island im Sommer 1860.

After graduation, Zirkel was engaged in teaching geology and mineralogy in Vienna at the Geological Institution. His journey to Iceland, along with travels to the Faeroe Islands, Scotland and England, and a meeting with Henry Clifton Sorby, led him from mining to the study of microscopical petrography, then a comparatively new science.

He became professor of geology in 1863 in the University of Lemberg, in 1868 at the University of Kiel, and in 1870 was made professor of mineralogy and geology in the University of Leipzig. He traveled for study in France, Italy, and Scotland; came to the United States in 1874 to examine the great collections of minerals made during the exploration of the fortieth degree of latitude; and in 1894-95 pursued scientific investigations in Ceylon and India.

He retired in 1909. He was an honorary D.Sc. of Oxford University, and also a foreign member of the Royal Society and an honorary member of the Mineralogical Society.

Publications
His numerous papers and essays include Geologische Skizze van der Westküste Schottlands (1871); Die Struktur der Variolite (1875); Microscopical Petrography (in Report of U.S. Geol. Exploration of 40th Par., vol. vi., 1876); Limurit aus der Vallée de Lesponne (1879); Über den Zirkon (1880). His separate works include Lehrbuch der Petrographie (1866; 2nd ed. 1893, 1894); Die mikroskopische Beschaffenheit der Mineralien und Gesteine (1873); and Über Urausscheidungen rheinischer Basalte (1893).

Recognition
Mount Zirkel in the Park Range of Colorado, USA, is named after him.
The mineral zirkelite is named after him.
Dorsum Zirkel on the Moon is named after him.

Notes

References

External links
Reise nach Island im Sommer 1860, mit wissenschaftlichen Anhängen, F. A. Brockhaus, 1862 at Google Books.
 

1838 births
1912 deaths
19th-century German geologists
Petrologists
Scientists from Bonn
People from the Rhine Province
University of Bonn alumni
Academic staff of the University of Kiel
Academic staff of Leipzig University
Wollaston Medal winners
Foreign Members of the Royal Society
Foreign associates of the National Academy of Sciences
20th-century German geologists